Jeison Andrés Palacios Murillo  (born 16 February 1988) is a Colombian footballer who plays as a centre-back for Cypriot First Division club Pafos.

Club career
In 19 June 2021, Palacios moved to Cyprus to sign for Pafos.

References

1994 births
Living people
Colombian footballers
Leones F.C. footballers
Atlético Nacional footballers
Alianza Petrolera players
Atlético Bucaramanga footballers
Independiente Santa Fe footballers
Pafos FC players
Categoría Primera A players
Categoría Primera B players
Cypriot First Division players
Colombian expatriate footballers
Expatriate footballers in Cyprus
Colombian expatriate sportspeople in Cyprus
Association football defenders
Sportspeople from Antioquia Department